Eamonn Kevin Roche  (June 14, 1922 – March 1, 2019) was an Irish-born American Pritzker Prize-winning architect. He was responsible for the design/master planning for over 200 built projects in both the U.S. and abroad. These projects include eight museums, 38 corporate headquarters, seven research facilities, performing arts centers, theaters, and campus buildings for six universities. In 1967 he created the master plan for the Metropolitan Museum of Art, and thereafter designed all of the new wings and installation of many collections including the reopened American and Islamic wings.

Born in Dublin and a graduate from University College Dublin, Roche went to the United States to study with Ludwig Mies van der Rohe at the Illinois Institute of Technology. In the U.S., he became the principal designer for Eero Saarinen, and opened his own architectural firm in 1967.

Among other awards, Roche received the Pritzker in 1982, the Gold Medal Award from the American Academy of Arts and Letters in 1990, and the AIA Gold Medal in 1993.

Biography
Born in Dublin, but raised in Mitchelstown, County Cork, Roche attended Rockwell College and graduated from University College Dublin in 1945. He then worked with Michael Scott from 1945 to 1946. From summer to fall of 1946, he worked with Maxwell Fry in London. In 1947, he applied for graduate studies at Harvard, Yale, and the Illinois Institute of Technology and was accepted at all three institutions, and left Ireland in 1948 to study under Ludwig Mies van der Rohe at the Illinois Institute of Technology.

In 1949, he worked at the planning office for the United Nations Headquarters building in New York City. In 1950, he joined the firm of Eero Saarinen and Associates. His future partner, John Dinkeloo (1918-1991), joined the firm in 1951 and this was also where Roche met his wife Jane. In 1954, he became the Principal Design Associate to Saarinen and assisted him on all projects from that time until Saarinen's death in September 1961.

In 1966, Roche and Dinkeloo formed Kevin Roche John Dinkeloo and Associates and completed Saarinen's projects. They completed 12 major unfinished Saarinen builds, including some of Saarinen's best-known work: the Gateway Arch, the expressionistic TWA Flight Center at JFK International Airport in New York City, Dulles International Airport outside Washington, DC, the strictly modern John Deere Headquarters in Moline, Illinois, and the CBS Headquarters building in New York City.

Following this, Roche and Dinkeloo's first major commission was the Oakland Museum of California, a complex for the art, natural history, and cultural history of California with a design featuring interrelated terraces and roof gardens. The city was planning a monumental building to house natural history, technology, and art, and Roche provided a unique concept: a building that is a series of low-level concrete structures covering a four block area, on three levels, the terrace of each level forming the roof of the one below, i.e. a museum (in three sections) with a park on its roof. This kind of innovative solution went on to become Roche's trademark.

This project was followed by the equally highly acclaimed Ford Foundation Building in New York City, considered the first large-scale architectural building in the U.S. to devote a substantial portion of its space to horticultural pursuits. Its famous atrium was designed with the notion of having urban green-space accessible to all and is an early example of the application of environmental psychology in architecture. The building was recognized in 1968 by Architectural Record as "a new kind of urban space".

The acclaim that greeted the Oakland Museum and Ford Foundation earned Kevin Roche John Dinkeloo and Associates a ranking at the top of their profession. Shortly afterward they began a 40-year association with the Metropolitan Museum of Art in New York City, for which they did extensive remodeling and built many extensions to house new galleries including the one containing the Egyptian Temple of Dendur. Other high-profile commissions for the firm came from clients as varied as Wesleyan University, the United Nations, Cummins Engines, Union Carbide, The United States Post Office, and the Knights of Columbus.

In 1982, Kevin Roche became one of the first recipients of the Pritzker Prize, generally regarded as architecture's equivalent to the Nobel prize. Following this accolade, Roche's practice went global, receiving commissions for buildings in Paris, Madrid, Singapore, and Tokyo. He completed his first and only Irish project, The Convention Centre Dublin, in 2010.

Kevin Roche John Dinkeloo and Associates has designed numerous corporate headquarters, office buildings, banks, museums, art centers, and even part of the Bronx Zoo. Roche served as a trustee of the American Academy in Rome, president of the American Academy of Arts and Letters, a member of the National Academy of Design, and a member of the U.S. Commission of Fine Arts.

Roche died on March 1, 2019, at his home in Guilford, Connecticut, aged 96.

Prizes and awards

The work of Kevin Roche has been the subject of special exhibitions at the Museum of Modern Art, the Architectural Association of Ireland in Dublin, and the American Academy and Institute of Arts and Letters. A 2012 exhibition, Kevin Roche: Architecture as Environment, opened at the Yale School of Architecture in New Haven, Connecticut, and has been viewed at The Museum of the City of New York, the Building Museum in Washington, and the University of Toronto.

In addition to the Pritzker Prize, Roche was the recipient of numerous honors and awards including the American Institute of Architects Gold Medal Award, the American Academy of Arts and Letters Gold Medal Award for Architecture, and the French Academie d'Architecture Grand Gold Medal.

Film

A feature documentary called Kevin Roche: The Quiet Architect was released in 2017. It was directed by Irish filmmaker (and former architecture student) Mark Noonan.

Buildings

1966 – Oakland Museum of California, Oakland, California
1968 – The Ford Foundation Building, New York, New York
1969 – Administration, Student Union & Physical Education Buildings, Rochester Institute of Technology, Rochester, New York
1969 – The Knights of Columbus Building Headquarters, New Haven, Connecticut
1969 – United States Post Office, Columbus, Indiana
1969 – Aetna Life and Casualty Company Computer Headquarters, Hartford, Connecticut
1971 – Power Center for the Performing Arts, University of Michigan, Ann Arbor, Michigan
1972 – Cummins Inc. Irwin Office Building Arcade, Columbus, Indiana
1972 - New Haven Coliseum, New Haven, Connecticut, (demolished 2002)
1973 – Center for the Arts, Wesleyan University, Middletown, Connecticut
1973 – Cummins Midrange Engine Plant, Columbus, Indiana
1974 – Fine Arts Center, University of Massachusetts Amherst, Amherst, Massachusetts
1974 – The Pyramids, College Life Insurance Company of America headquarters, Indianapolis, Indiana
1978 – John Deere World Headquarters, West Office Building, Moline, Illinois
1979 – Denver Performing Arts Complex, Denver, Colorado
1982 – The Corporate Center, Danbury, Connecticut (originally the Union Carbide Corporate Center)
1982 – Moudy Visual Arts and Communication Building, Texas Christian University, Fort Worth, Texas
1983 – 2 United Nations Plaza, New York, New York
1983 – General Foods Corporate Headquarters, Ryebrook, New York
1983 – Cummins Corporate Office Building, Columbus, Indiana
1985 – Cummins Engine Company Corporate Headquarters, Columbus, Indiana
1985 – DeWitt Wallace Decorative Arts Museum, Williamsburg, Virginia
1986 – Conoco Inc. Petroleum Headquarters, Houston, Texas
1988 – Central Park Zoo, New York, New York
1988 – Bouygues World Headquarters, Saint-Quentin-Yvelines, France
1989 – Leo Burnett Building Company Headquarters, Chicago, Illinois
1990 – 750 7th Avenue, New York, New York
1990 – Metropolitano Office Building, Madrid, Spain
1992 – J. P. Morgan Headquarters, New York, New York
1993 – Corning Incorporated Corporate Headquarters, Corning, New York
1993 – Merck & Co. Inc. Headquarters, Whitehouse Station, New Jersey
1993 – NationsBank Building (now Bank of America Plaza), Atlanta, Georgia
1993 – Borland International Corporate Headquarters, Scotts Valley, California
1993 – Tanjong and Binariang Headquarters/Menara Maxis, Kuala Lumpur, Malaysia
1994 – Pontiac Marina Millenia Tower and Ritz-Carlton Hotel, Singapore
1995 – Dai-ichi Life Headquarters/ Norinchukin Bank Headquarters, DN Tower 21, Tokyo, Japan
1996 – Cummins Columbus Engine Plant Expansion, Columbus, Indiana
1997 – Zesiger Sports and Fitness Center, Massachusetts Institute of Technology, Cambridge, Massachusetts
1997 – Shiodome City Center, Tokyo, Japan
1997 – Helen and Martin Kimmel Center for University Life/ Skirball Center for the Performing Arts, New York University, New York, New York
1997 – Lucent Technologies, Lisle, IL/Naperville, Illinois
1997 – Museum of Jewish Heritage, New York, New York
2000 – Ciudad Grupo Santander, Madrid, Spain
2001 – Securities and Exchange Commission Headquarters, Washington, D.C.
2002 – Bouygues SA Holding Company Headquarters, Paris, France
2003 – 1101 New York Avenue, Washington, D.C.
2003 – Renovation to Greek and Roman Court at Metropolitan Museum of Art, New York, New York
2005 – Lafayette Tower, Washington, D.C.
2007 – Renovation to American Museum of Natural History, New York, New York
2008 – Renovation to American Wing at Metropolitan Museum of Art, New York, New York
2009 – David S. Ingalls Rink Restoration and Addition, Yale University, New Haven, Connecticut
2010 – Convention Centre Dublin, Dublin, Ireland
2011 – Renovation to Islamic Wing at Metropolitan Museum of Art, New York, New York

Awards and honors
Roche was the recipient of numerous honors and awards, including:
 Pritzker Prize
 American Institute of Architects – AIA Gold Medal
 American Academy of Arts and Letters Gold Medals – Gold Medal Award for Architecture
 Academie d'Architecture – Grand Gold Medal
 Total Design Award, American Society of Interior Designers
 Medal of Honor, New York Chapter of the AIA
 American Institute of Architects Twenty-five Year Award
 Classical America's Arthur Ross Award
 Brendan Gill Prize of the Municipal Art Society of New York
 R. S. Reynolds Memorial Award
 New York State Award
 California Governor's Award for Excellence in Design
 Albert S. Bard First Honor Awards, City Club of New York
 Brandeis University Creative Arts Award in Architecture
 Brunner Award of the American Institute of Art and Letters
 New York Chapter American Institute of Architects Award

Honorary Degrees:
 Wesleyan University, Doctorate of Fine Arts
 National University of Ireland, Doctorate of Fine Arts
 Albertus Magnus College, Doctorate of Fine Arts
 Iona College, Doctorate of Fine Arts
 Yale University, Doctorate of Fine Arts

Further reading
Articles
 Currey, Mason. “Rediscovered Masterpiece: Ford Foundation”, Metropolis (December 2008), pp. 90–104
 McMillan, Elizabeth. “Kevin Roche: Pritzker Prize Winner”, Veranda (October 2007), pp. 150–158, 241.
 Lee, Sangleem. “Kevin Roche”, Space (July 2006); pp. 159–181.

Special magazine editions
 Nakamura, Toshio. Kevin Roche, Architecture and Urbanism (A+U) Extra Edition, Tokyo, Japan: The Japan Architect Co. Ltd. Yoshio Yoshida, Publisher, 1987
 Hozumi, Toshio et al. Latest Works of Kevin Roche John Dinkeloo and Associates, Architecture & Urbanism, (A+U), No. 211, Tokyo, Japan: The Japan Architect Co., Ltd., April, 1988, No.211.
 Hara, Hiroshi and Nobutaka Ashira. America's New Architectural Wave: The Architect Kevin Roche's Appearance on The Scene, SD Space Design No. 63, A Monthly Journal of Art & Architecture, Tokyo, Japan: January 1970.
 Miller, Nory. Roche Dinkeloo, General Foods Headquarters, Texas Christian University Visual Arts Center, One Summit Square, Deere Financial Services Hdqrs., & Kevin Roche Interview Global Architecture, GA Document 9, A.D.A. EDITA Tokyo Co., Ltd., February 1984.
 Futagawa, Yukio. Roche Dinkeloo, 6 High Rise Projects Deutsche Bank, J. P. Morgan, Design for Two Buildings in Denver, Dallas Competition, High Rise Study in Houston]. Global Architecture, GA Document 12. Tokyo, Japan: A.D.A. EDITA Tokyo Co., Ltd., January 1985.
 Miller, Nory. Roche Dinkeloo Cummins Engine Company Corporate Office Building, Columbus Indiana & Conoco Inc. Petroleum Headquarters, Global Architecture, GA Document 14, editing and publishing by Yukio Futagawa, A.D.A. EDITA Tokyo Co., Ltd., photographs, RETORIA: Y. Futagawa & Associated Photographers, December 1985.
 Futagawa, Yukio. Roche Dinkeloo, Bouygues Headquarters,Global Architecture, GA Document 22. Tokyo, Japan: A.D.A. EDITA Tokyo Co., Ltd., January 1989.

References

External links

 Profile. archiseek.com
 New Haven Coliseum infosite. yurgeles.net
 Kevin Roche profile. PritzkerPrize.com
 Yale School of Architecture Honors Kevin Roche with Exhibition, Symposium.
 Kevin Roche's six buildings in Columbus, Indiana columbus.in.us
Oral history interview with Kevin Roche, 1995 Jan. 4 from The Metropolitan Museum of Art Archives, New York.

20th-century Irish architects
1922 births
2019 deaths
Alumni of University College Dublin
Illinois Institute of Technology alumni
Pritzker Architecture Prize winners
People from County Dublin
Irish emigrants to the United States
People educated at Rockwell College
Members of the Académie d'architecture
Presidents of the American Academy of Arts and Letters
Recipients of the AIA Gold Medal